Rhett Lewis Kleinschmidt (born March 23, 1983) is an American sports reporter and previously the host of NFL Network's weekday morning show NFL AM.

Early years
Lewis was born and raised in Metairie, Louisiana, the son of Marlene and NFL athletic trainer Dean Kleinschmidt. He attended Indiana University, where he played football and majored in sports broadcasting. In his middle school years, he was diagnosed with a severe case of Osgood-Schlatter Disease.

Accomplishments
In 2017, he founded The Sam Dozier Champions Cup in honor of former St. Martin's Episcopal School Coach Sam "The Bull" Dozier.

Career
In May 2009, he joined WHDH Boston as a sports reporter after serving as a sports director for KLBK in Texas for two years. In July 2014, he joined NFL Network as a host of "NFL AM."

In May 2022, Lewis was named the new radio analyst for Indiana, replacing the retiring Buck Suhr.

References

External links
NFL.com Profile
Indiana Hoosiers bio

Living people
1983 births
Indiana Hoosiers football players
People from Metairie, Louisiana